Hyporhamphus melanochir, or Southern garfish or (in Australia) garfish, is a halfbeak garfish from the family Hemiramphidae. It is found in southern Australian and New Zealand waters. It is a very popular fish for recreational fishing and eating in Australia, where it is referred to simply as 'garfish' or 'gar'.

References

melanochir
Fish described in 1847
Fish of New Zealand
Fish of Australia